Konjevan (also Romanized as Konjevān; also known as Ganjāvān and Gonjevān) is a village in Baraan-e Shomali Rural District, in the Central District of Isfahan County, Isfahan Province, Iran. At the 2006 census, its population was 429, in 92 families.

References 

Populated places in Isfahan County